Bevan Rodd (born 26 August 2000) is an English professional rugby union player from the Dunoon, who plays for Sale Sharks as a Prop.

Career
Born in Scotland, Rodd grew up on the Isle of Man and was educated at The Buchan School. He later attended Sedbergh School and subsequently came through the Sale Sharks academy, making his professional debut against Northampton Saints in a Premiership Rugby Cup match under Steve Diamond in 2019. He really made his professional breakthrough the following season under the management of Paul Deacon and Alex Sanderson.

Having become a regular starter for Sale at the age of twenty, on 4 April 2021 he was a starter against the Scarlets in Sale's 57–14 away Champions Cup victory. He still figured in the starting XV a week later, for the quarter-final defeat against La Rochelle.

International career 
Rodd represented the England Under-16 and England under-18 team. He was also a member of the squad that lost to Ireland in the opening round of the 2019 Six Nations Under 20s Championship. Eligible for both Scotland and England national teams, he has reportedly been reviewed by Eddie Jones and Matt Proudfoot for future selection.

In June 2021 he was included in the England senior squad for the 2021 Summer Internationals, but was not featured in either of the tests.

On 10 November 2021 Rodd was called up to the England squad for the 2021 Autumn Nations Series for England's match against Australia. He replaced Joe Marler, who had tested positive for COVID 19 and was forced to pull out for the match. Rodd was initially named on the bench against Australia, before being moved to the starting line up after starting loosehead Ellis Genge also had to withdraw due to COVID-19.

He earned his first England cap in the 32-15 victory over the Wallabies. He then started a week later against South Africa, with Genge still unavailable for selection and Marler only coming out of isolation a few days before. Rodd finished his 2021 Autumn Nations Series with a 27-26 win over the world champions.

Rodd was included in the initial 36 man England training squad for the 2022 Six Nations Championship.

References

External links
 

2000 births
Living people
English rugby union players
Manx rugby union players
People educated at Sedbergh School
Rugby union players from Dunoon
Rugby union props
Sale Sharks players
Scottish rugby union players
England international rugby union players